HMCS Napanee was a  of the Royal Canadian Navy during the Second World War. She saw service primarily in the Battle of the Atlantic as a convoy escort. She is named after Napanee, Ontario.

Background

Flower-class corvettes like Napanee serving with the Royal Canadian Navy during the Second World War were different from earlier and more traditional sail-driven corvettes. The "corvette" designation was created by the French for classes of small warships; the Royal Navy borrowed the term for a period but discontinued its use in 1877. During the hurried preparations for war in the late 1930s, Winston Churchill reactivated the corvette class, needing a name for smaller ships used in an escort capacity, in this case based on a whaling ship design. The generic name "flower" was used to designate the class of these ships, which – in the Royal Navy – were named after flowering plants.

Corvettes commissioned by the Royal Canadian Navy during the Second World War were named after communities for the most part, to better represent the people who took part in building them. This idea was put forth by Admiral Percy W. Nelles. Sponsors were commonly associated with the community for which the ship was named. Royal Navy corvettes were designed as open sea escorts, while Canadian corvettes were developed for coastal auxiliary roles which was exemplified by their minesweeping gear. Eventually the Canadian corvettes would be modified to allow them to perform better on the open seas.

Construction
Napanee was ordered 7 February 1940 as part of the 1939-1940 Flower-class building program. She was laid down by Kingston Shipbuilding Co. in Kingston, Ontario on 20 March 1940 and launched on 31 August 1940. She was commissioned on 12 May 1941 at Montreal, Quebec.

During her career, Napanee underwent two significant refits. Her first major overhaul began 22 May 1943 at Montreal and took five months to complete. During this refit, Napanee had her fo'c'sle extended. Her second significant refit took place at Pictou, Nova Scotia and began in August 1944.

War duty
After arriving at Halifax for deployment, Napanee was initially assigned to Sydney Force. In September 1941, she was transferred to the Newfoundland Escort Force escorting convoys between St. John's and Iceland. She remained on this route until the European destination changed to Derry in January 1942.

Napanee escorted 12 trans-Atlantic convoys without loss before assignment to Mid-Ocean Escort Force (MOEF) group C1 in September 1942.  With group C1, she shared credit for sinking U-356 during the battle for convoy ON 154 in December 1942, and participated in the battle for convoy KMS 10G.  Napanee escorted 11 trans-Atlantic convoys without loss in 1944, and spent 1945 escorting North American coastal convoys with the Western Local Escort Force (WLEF). During her time with WLEF, Napanee was part of two escort group, W-3 initially and W-2 after her second refit until the end of the war.

Trans-Atlantic convoys escorted

Post war service
Napanee was paid off on 12 July 1945 at Sorel, Quebec after the war had ended. She was sold for scrapping in June 1946 and broken up at Hamilton, Ontario.

References

Flower-class corvettes of the Royal Canadian Navy
1940 ships